Matty Hercu Lees (born 4 February 1998) is an English professional rugby league footballer who plays as a  for St Helens in the Super League and the England Knights and England at international level.

He has spent time on loan from Saints at the Sheffield Eagles in the Betfred Championship.

Career
Lees made his Super League and professional début on 7 September 2017 at Belle Vue against Wakefield. Saints won the game 16-18.

In 2018, he played for the Sheffield Eagles on Dual registration.

He played for St Helens in their 8-4 2020 Super League Grand Final victory over Wigan at the Kingston Communications Stadium in Hull.

On 17 July 2021, Lees played for St. Helens in their 26-12 2021 Challenge Cup Final victory over Castleford.
On 9 October 2021, Lees played for St. Helens in their 12-10 2021 Super League Grand Final victory over Catalans Dragons.
On 24 September 2022, Lees scored the fastest try in Super League Grand Final history after crossing over in the second minute of play during St Helens 24-12 victory over Leeds in the decider.
On 18 February 2023, Lees played in St Helens 13-12 upset victory over Penrith in the 2023 World Club Challenge.

International career
In July 2018 he was selected in the England Knights Performance squad. Later that year he was selected for the England Knights on their tour of Papua New Guinea. He played against Papua New Guinea at the PNG Football Stadium and the Oil Search National Football Stadium.

References

External links
St Helens profile
SL profile
Saints Heritage Society profile
England profile

1998 births
Living people
England Knights national rugby league team players
England national rugby league team players
Rugby league props
Rugby league second-rows
St Helens R.F.C. players
Sheffield Eagles players